Prathama Ushakirana (English: The First Morning Ray) is a 1990 Indian Kannada fiction drama film directed by Suresh Heblikar, written by Ashok Pai and produced under Manasa Arts. Besides Heblikar in the lead, the film features Geetha, Girish Karnad, Pramila Joshai and Vanitha Vasu in the pivotal roles. The film's music was composed by Vijaya Bhaskar and the cinematography was by P. Rajan.

The film dealt with child psychiatry as the main theme and met with critical appraise and went on to win several awards at the Karnataka State Film Awards 1989-90 and the 38th Filmfare Awards South. Besides winning awards, the film was screened at various international film festivals.

Cast 
 Suresh Heblikar as Shridhar
 Geetha 
 Girish Karnad Psychiatrist
 Vanitha Vasu
 Pramila Joshai Seeta
 Sumana
 Shyamala
 Nagathihalli Chandrashekar
 Mimicry Dayanand Shettru
 Shanthamma
 S. Malathi
 Baby Nisha Shenoy G
 Master Damarugendra
 Master Abhishek
 Narayana Rao

Music 
The soundtrack and score for the film was composed by Vijaya Bhaskar.

Awards
The film won multiple awards for the year 1990.

 Karnataka State Film Awards

1989-90 :
 Karnataka State Film Award for Third Best Film - Manasa Arts
 Karnataka State Film Award for Best Child Actor (Male) - Master Damarugendra

38th Filmfare Awards South
1990:
 Filmfare Award for Best Film - Manasa Arts
 Filmfare Award for Best Director - Suresh Heblikar

References

External links 
 

1990 films
1990s Kannada-language films
Indian drama films
Films about children
Films scored by Vijaya Bhaskar